Sergey Nazarovych Bubka (Serhiy Nazarovych Bubka; born 4 December 1963) is a Ukrainian former pole vaulter. He represented the Soviet Union until its dissolution in 1991. Bubka was twice named Athlete of the Year by Track & Field News, and in 2012 was one of 24 athletes inducted as inaugural members of the International Association of Athletics Federations Hall of Fame.

Bubka won six consecutive IAAF World Championships, an Olympic gold medal and broke the world record for men's pole vault 35 times. He was the first pole vaulter to clear 6.0 metres and 6.10 metres.

He held the indoor world record of 6.15 metres, set on 21 February 1993 in Donetsk, Ukraine for almost 21 years until France's Renaud Lavillenie cleared 6.16 metres on 15 February 2014 at the same meet in the same arena. He held the outdoor world record at 6.14 metres between 31 July 1994, and 17 September 2020 when Sweden's Armand Duplantis cleared 6.15 metres, though since adopting rule 260.18a in 2000 the IAAF regards the indoor record as the official "world record".

Bubka is Senior Vice President of the International Association of Athletics Federations (IAAF), serving since 2007, and President of the National Olympic Committee of Ukraine, serving since 2005. He is also an Honorary Member of the International Olympic Committee (IOC), having been involved since 1996. His older brother, Vasiliy Bubka, was also a medal-winning pole vaulter.

Biography
Born in Luhansk, Sergey Nazarovych Bubka was a track-and-field athlete in the 100-meter dash and the long jump, but became a world-class champion only when he turned to the pole vault. In 1983, virtually unknown internationally, he won the world championship in Helsinki, Finland, and the following year set his first world record, clearing 5.85m (19 ft 2 in). Until the dissolution of the USSR in late 1991, Bubka competed for Soviet teams. The Soviet sports system rewarded athletes for setting new world records, and he became noted for establishing new records by slim amounts, sometimes as little as a centimeter higher. This allowed him to collect frequent bonus payments and made Bubka an attraction at track-and-field meets. By 1992, he was no longer bound to the Soviet system, and signed a contract with Nike that rewarded each world record performance with special bonuses of $40,000.

He has a son who was a professional tennis player, whose name is Sergei.

Pole vault career
Sergey Bubka started competing on the international athletics scene in 1981 when he participated in the European Junior Championship finishing seventh. But the 1983 World Championship held in Helsinki was his actual entry point to the world athletics, where a relatively unknown Bubka snatched the gold, clearing 5.70 metres (18 feet 8 inches). The years that followed witnessed the unparalleled dominance of Bubka, with him setting new records and standards in pole vaulting.

He set his first world record of 5.85m on 26 May 1984 which he improved to 5.88m a week later, and then to 5.90m a month later. He cleared 6.00 metres (19 feet 8 inches) for the first time on 13 July 1985 in Paris. This height had long been considered unattainable. With virtually no opponents, Bubka improved his own record over the next 10 years until he reached his career best and the then world record of 6.14 m (20 feet 1 inches) in 1994. He primarily vaulted on UCS Spirit poles throughout his later career.

He became the first athlete ever to jump over 6.10 metres, in San Sebastián, Spain in 1991. Until January 2014, no other athlete on earth had cleared 6.07, indoors or outdoors. In 1994, he achieved his personal record with a vault of 6.14 meters, long after many commentators assumed the great sportsman was retired. Bubka increased the world record by 21 centimetres (8 inches) in the period from 1984 to 1988, more than other pole vaulters had achieved in the previous 12 years. He cleared 6.00 meters or better on 45 occasions. As of June 2015, 6 meters had been cleared by all athletes worldwide exactly 100 times.

Bubka officially retired from pole vault in 2001 during a ceremony at his Pole Vault Stars meeting in Donetsk.

Olympics curse
Despite his dominance in pole vault, Bubka had a relatively poor record in the Olympic Games. The first Olympics after Bubka's introduction to the international athletics was held in 1984 and was boycotted by the USSR along with the majority of other Eastern Bloc countries. Two months before the Games he vaulted 12 cm higher than the eventual Olympic gold medal winner Pierre Quinon. In 1988 Bubka competed in the Seoul Olympics and won his only Olympic gold medal clearing 5.90 m. In 1992 he failed to clear in his first three attempts (5.70, 5.70, 5.75 m) and was out of the Barcelona Olympics. At the Atlanta Olympics in 1996 a heel injury caused him to withdraw from the competition without any attempts. In 2000 at the Sydney Olympics he was eliminated from the final after three unsuccessful attempts at 5.70 m.

IAAF World championships
Bubka won the pole vault event in six consecutive IAAF World Championships in Athletics in the period from 1983 to 1997:

World record progression 
Bubka broke the world record for men's pole vault 35 times during his career. He broke the outdoor world record 17 times and the indoor world record 18 times. Bubka lost his outdoor world record only once in his illustrious career. After Thierry Vigneron, of France, broke his record on 31 August 1984 at the Golden Gala international track meet in Rome, Bubka subsequently reclaimed the record on his next attempt on the same runway, just minutes later.

Technique

Bubka possessed great strength, speed and gymnastic abilities. He gripped the pole higher than most vaulters to get extra leverage, though Bubka himself played down the effect of grip alone.

His development and mastery of the Petrov/Bubka technical model is also considered a key to his success. (A technical model is a sequence of positions and pressures which describe the method and style form of pole vaulting.) The Petrov/Bubka model is considered superior to many others today, because it allows the vaulter to continuously put energy into the pole while rising towards the bar. Most conventional models focus on creating maximum bend in the pole before leaving the ground, by planting the pole heavily in the pole vault box. The Petrov/Bubka model follows the technique used by Kjell Isaksson, which concentrates on driving the pole up, rather than bending it while planting it on the landing pad, combined with high running speed. While the traditional models depended on the recoil by bending the pole, the Petrov/Bubka model may exploit the recoil of the pole and exert more energy on the pole during the swinging action.

Awards and positions held

 Bubka won the Prince of Asturias Award in Sports in 1991
 Bubka was awarded the best sportsman of the Soviet Union for three years in a row from 1984 to 1986
 Bubka was voted Sportsman of the Year for 1997 by the influential newspaper L'Équipe
 Bubka was honored as the best pole vaulter of the last half century by Track & Field News
 Bubka entered in FICTS Hall of Fame and was awarded with Excellence Guirlande d'Honneur in 2001.
 Bubka was designated an IAAF council member in 2001. In 2011, he was elected a vice-president of the organization for a four-year term.
 He is currently serving as the president of National Olympic Committee of Ukraine and is an IOC member
 Bubka was designated UNESCO Champion for Sport in 2003
 In 2005 he received the Panathlon International Flambeau d'Or for his contribution to the development and promotion of sport.
 From 2002 to 2006, he was a member of the Ukrainian Parliament and its committee on youth policy, physical culture, sport and tourism
 Bubka won the Marca Leyenda in 2005
 He was awarded the Hero of Ukraine civilian award in 2001
 Completed his term in IOC athletes commission in August 2008

Today Bubka is a member of the 'Champions for Peace' club, a group of more than 90 famous elite created by Peace and Sport, a Monaco-based international organization placed under the High Patronage of H.S.H Prince Albert II. This group of top level champions, wish to make sport a tool for dialogue and social cohesion. http://www.peace-sport.org/our-champions-of-peace/

IAAF
Bubka has been involved with the International Association of Athletics Federations (IAAF) since 2001 and has served as a vice president since 2007.
During this time, he remained on the Athletes' Commission (2001–2011) and is also a Council Member for ASOIF, the Association for Summer Olympic International Federations. Bubka commented: "I have been working at the IAAF for a long time and my work is not limited to one area. The good of athletics is something deep in my heart." Bubka has been IAAF Council Member (2001-), IAAF senior vice-president (2007–2011), vice-president (2011-), IAAF Development Commission deputy chairman (2007–2011), then chairman (2011-), IAAF Athletes Commission member (2001–2011) and IAAF Competition Commission member (2003-). He was also a Coordination Commission chairman of IAAF World Championships in Daegu 2011 and Moscow 2013.

National Olympic Committee
As President of the National Olympic Committee of Ukraine since 2005, he has transformed the organisation into one of the most progressive in the world. It has staff based in all of the nation's 27 regions with each taking responsibility for delivering an array of programmes designed to bring youngsters into sport, realise the potential of the most able and promote the Olympic Movement and its values.
A National Olympic Day, the Olympic Stork which provides Olympic-themed education to more than 250,000 school classes across the country, televised annual awards and an Olympic Academy have all been established under Bubka's reign. "NOCs must do more than select and send teams to Olympic Games", says Bubka. "They are at the forefront of efforts to educate young people and help them become involved in sport and adopt a healthy lifestyle. To do that we need to work together globally because if we don't we risk losing the younger generation."

International Olympic Committee (IOC)
Sergey Bubka first got involved with the International Olympic Committee (IOC) in 1996 when he was elected as a Member of the Athletes' Commission, providing input into the governance of sport from the perspective of an active athlete. Almost 20 years later he is still involved as an Honorary Member. "I knew that I wanted to be involved in running sport and, in particular to be involved in the Olympic Movement", he said. He became an IOC Member in 1999 and has been involved in a wide range of Commissions, including Chairman of the Evaluation and then the Coordination Commissions for the inaugural Youth Olympic Games in Singapore in 2010. On 28 May 2013 Sergey Bubka announced that he would run for President of the International Olympic Committee. At the 125th IOC Session in Buenos Aires he lost the vote to Thomas Bach.

Sources

See also
 6 metres club

References

External links

 
 IAAF profile for Sergey Bubka

1963 births
Living people
Sportspeople from Luhansk
National University of Ukraine on Physical Education and Sport alumni
Honoured Masters of Sport of the USSR
Recipients of the Order of Lenin
Recipients of the Order of Merit (Ukraine), 1st class
Recipients of the Order of Merit (Ukraine), 2nd class
Recipients of the Order of Prince Yaroslav the Wise, 3rd class
Recipients of the Order of Prince Yaroslav the Wise, 4th class
Recipients of the Order of Prince Yaroslav the Wise, 5th class
Recipients of the Order of the Red Banner of Labour
Recipients of the Order of State
Soviet male pole vaulters
Ukrainian male pole vaulters
Athletes (track and field) at the 1988 Summer Olympics
Athletes (track and field) at the 1992 Summer Olympics
Athletes (track and field) at the 1996 Summer Olympics
Athletes (track and field) at the 2000 Summer Olympics
Athletics (track and field) administrators
European Athletics Championships medalists
International Olympic Committee members
Olympic athletes of the Soviet Union
Olympic athletes of the Unified Team
Olympic athletes of Ukraine
Olympic gold medalists for the Soviet Union
World Athletics Championships medalists
World record setters in athletics (track and field)
European champions for Ukraine
Independent politicians in Ukraine
Party of Regions politicians
Fourth convocation members of the Verkhovna Rada
Ukrainian sportsperson-politicians
Presidents of the National Olympic Committee of Ukraine
Medalists at the 1988 Summer Olympics
Olympic gold medalists in athletics (track and field)
Goodwill Games medalists in athletics
Track & Field News Athlete of the Year winners
World Athletics Indoor Championships winners
World Athletics Championships winners
Competitors at the 1986 Goodwill Games
Competitors at the 1994 Goodwill Games
Friendship Games medalists in athletics
Recipients of the Honorary Diploma of the Cabinet of Ministers of Ukraine